Kapetaniana is a small village on the island of Crete in Greece. The village has approximately 80 inhabitants and is built on the slopes of Asterousia Mountains at an altitude of 750m, with views of the Libyan Sea and the Messara Plain.

External links
Kapetaniana from interkriti.org

Populated places in Heraklion (regional unit)